Marsa Alam International Airport  is an international airport located 60 km north of Marsa Alam in Egypt. It is an important destination for leisure flights from Europe.

Overview
It was built in response to the increasing needs of European travelers to this southern Red Sea destination, along with other airports on the Red Sea such as Hurghada International Airport, being inaugurated on 16 October 2003. The official name of the airport until 2011 was Marsa Mubarak Airport. The airport is privately owned and operated by EMAK Marsa Alam for Management & Operation Airports, a subsidiary of the M.A. Al-Kharafi Group of Kuwait.

Airlines and destinations
The following airlines operate regular scheduled and charter flights at Marsa Alam Airport:

See also 
List of airports in Egypt

References

External links

 
 

Airports in Egypt
2003 establishments in Egypt